Newton House may refer to:

Places

United Kingdom
 Newton House (Llandeilo, Carmarthenshire)
 Newton House (Brecon, Powys)
Newton Surmaville (also known as Newton House), in Somerset

in the United States
McDonald-Wait-Newton House, Little Rock, Arkansas, listed on the National Register of Historic Places (NRHP) in Little Rock Arkansas
Rev. Thomas Newton House, Ashville, Alabama, NRHP-listed in St. Clair County
Newton House (Athens, Georgia), NRHP-listed in Clarke County
James P. Newton House and Maid Cottage, Sioux City, Iowa, NRHP-listed in Woodbury County, Iowa
Newton-Kemp Houses, Bowling Green, Kentucky, listed on the NRHP in Warren County, Kentucky
Newton House (Clay Village, Kentucky), listed on the NRHP in Kentucky
Azariah Newton House, Milford, Massachusetts, listed on the NRHP in Massachusetts
S. D. Newton House, Worcester, Massachusetts, listed on the NRHP in Massachusetts
Charles Newton House, Worcester, Massachusetts, listed on the NRHP in Massachusetts
Newton-Allaire House, Cheboygan, Michigan, listed on the NRHP in Michigan
George Newton House, Marcellus, Michigan, listed on the NRHP in Michigan
Newton Friends' Meetinghouse, Camden, New Jersey, listed on the NRHP in New Jersey
Philo Newton Cobblestone House, Hartland, New York, listed on the NRHP in New York
A. Newton Farm, Orleans, New York, listed on the NRHP in New York
Newton Homestead, South Otselic, New York, listed on the NRHP in New York
Newton Homesite and Cemetery, Carolina Beach, North Carolina, listed on the NRHP in North Carolina
Judge Eben Newton House, Canfield, Ohio, listed on the NRHP in Ohio
Newton House (Austin, Texas), listed on the NRHP in Texas
William Walter Newton House, Jacksonville, Texas, listed on the NRHP in Texas
Marvin Newton House, Brookfield Center, Vermont, listed on the NRHP in Vermont